The National Education Examinations Authority (NEEA) is an independent non-profit institution under the Ministry of Education of China. Headquartered in Beijing, the institution is mainly responsible for major education examinations in China.

On February 16, 2022, following the Ministry of Education's organizational adjustment on its subordinate independent institutions, NEEA's Chinese name changed from "教育部考试中心" to "教育部教育考试院".

Tests

National Examinations
 National College Entrance Examination (普通高等学校招生全国统一考试, NCEE): Regular university or college entrance exam for students who have experienced senior high school education
 National College Entrance Examination For Adults (成人高等学校招生全国统一考试): Test to enter adult college or adult(continuing) education college in regular university
 National Postgraduate Entrance Examination (全国硕士研究生招生考试, NPEE): an admission requirement for all graduate schools
 Self-Taught Higher Education Examinations (高等教育自学考试, STHEE): tests for getting a graduate certificate and bachelor's degree through self-study
 National Teacher Certification Examination (中小学教师资格考试, NTCE)

Social Certificate Examinations
 College English Test
 National Computer Rank Examination (全国计算机等级考试, NCRE)
 National Applied Information Level Test (全国计算机应用水平考试, NIT): Test inspired by Cambridge Information Technology
 Quanguo Waiyu Shuiping Kaoshi (WSK), including the Public English Test System (PETS) which goes up to PETS-5
 Chinese Calligraphy and Painting Test (书画等级考试, CCPT)

Stopped
 National Accreditation Examinations for Translators and Interpreters (NAETI)

Overseas Examinations in Mainland China
 TOEFL
 IELTS
 TestDaF
 JLPT
 TOPIK
 GRE
 GMAT
 DELF-DALF (Diplôme d'études en langue française and Diplôme approfondi de langue française )
 DELE
 LSAT
 GELPE-BRAS (CELPE-Bras)
 CYLE (Cambridge English: Young Learners)
 MSE (Main Suite Examinations of Cambridge Assessment English)
 CAEL (Canadian Academic English Language Assessment)
Source:

References
 Liu, Qingsi (The National Education Examinations Authority). "The National Education Examinations Authority and its English Language Tests." In: Cheng, Liying and Andy Curtis. English Language Assessment and the Chinese Learner. Routledge, March 17, 2010. , 9781135213879. Start: p. 29.

Notes

External links
 National Education Examinations Authority 
 English introduction

Educational testing and assessment organizations
Standardised tests in China
Organizations established in 1987
Educational organizations based in China
1987 establishments in China